{{Infobox election
| election_name = 1968 United States presidential election| country = United States
| flag_year = 1960
| type = presidential
| opinion_polls = Nationwide opinion polling for the 1968 United States presidential election
| previous_election = 1964 United States presidential election
| previous_year = 1964
| election_date = November 5, 1968
| next_election = 1972 United States presidential election
| next_year = 1972
| votes_for_election = 538 members of the Electoral College
| needed_votes = 270 electoral
| turnout = 62.5%  0.3 pp
| image_size = x160px

| image1 = File:Richard Nixon portrait.jpg
| nominee1 = Richard Nixon| party1 = Republican Party (United States)
| home_state1 = New York
| running_mate1 = Spiro Agnew| electoral_vote1 = 301| states_carried1 = 32| popular_vote1 = 31,783,783| percentage1 = | image2 = File:Hubert Humphrey crop.jpg
| nominee2 = Hubert Humphrey
| party2 = Democratic Party (United States)
| home_state2 = Minnesota
| running_mate2 = Edmund Muskie
| electoral_vote2 = 191
| states_carried2 = 13 + DC
| popular_vote2 = 31,271,839
| percentage2 = 

| image3 = File:George C Wallace.jpg
| nominee3 = George Wallace
| party3 = American Independent Party
| home_state3 = Alabama
| running_mate3 = Curtis LeMay
| electoral_vote3 = 46
| states_carried3 = 5
| popular_vote3 = 9,901,118
| percentage3 = 
| color3 = FF7F00

| map_size = 350px
| map = 
| map_caption = Presidential election results map. Red denotes states won by Nixon/Agnew, blue denotes those won by Humphrey/Muskie, and orange denotes those won by Wallace/LeMay, including a North Carolina faithless elector. Numbers indicate electoral votes cast by each state.
| title = President
| before_election = Lyndon B. Johnson
| before_party = Democratic Party (United States)
| after_election = Richard Nixon
| after_party = Republican Party (United States)
| ongoing = 
}}

The 1968 United States presidential election was the 46th quadrennial presidential election, held on Tuesday, November 5, 1968. The Republican nominee, former vice president  Richard Nixon, defeated both the Democratic nominee, incumbent vice president Hubert Humphrey, and the American Independent Party nominee, former Alabama governor George Wallace.

Incumbent president Lyndon B. Johnson had been the early front-runner for the Democratic Party's nomination, but he withdrew from the race after only narrowly winning the New Hampshire primary. Eugene McCarthy, Robert F. Kennedy, and Humphrey emerged as the three major candidates in the Democratic primaries, until Kennedy was assassinated. His death after midnight on June 6 made a record of four assassinations in the 1960s. Humphrey edged out anti-Vietnam war candidate McCarthy to win the Democratic nomination, sparking numerous anti-war protests. Nixon entered the Republican primaries as the front-runner, defeating liberal New York governor Nelson Rockefeller, conservative governor of California Ronald Reagan, and other candidates to win his party's nomination. Alabama's Democratic former governor, George Wallace, ran on the American Independent Party ticket, campaigning in favor of racial segregation on the basis of "state's rights". The election year was tumultuous and chaotic. It was marked by the assassination of Martin Luther King, Jr. in early April, and the subsequent 54 days of riots across the nation, by the assassination of Robert F. Kennedy in early June, and by widespread opposition to the Vietnam War across university campuses. Vice President Hubert Humphrey won and secured the Democratic nomination, with Humphrey promising to continue Johnson's war on poverty and to support the civil rights movement.

The support of civil rights by the Johnson administration hurt Humphrey's image in the South, leading to the prominent Democratic governor of Alabama, George Wallace, to mount a third-party challenge against his own party to defend racial segregation on the basis of "state's rights". Wallace led a far-right American Independent Party attracting socially conservative voters throughout the South, and encroaching further support from white working-class voters in the Industrial North and Midwest who were attracted to Wallace's economic populism and anti-establishment rhetoric. In doing so, Wallace split the New Deal Coalition, winning over Southern Democrats, as well as former Goldwater supporters who preferred Wallace to Nixon. Nixon chose to take advantage of Democratic infighting by running a more centrist platform aimed at attracting moderate voters as part of his "silent majority" who were alienated by both the liberal agenda that was advocated by Hubert Humphrey, and by the ultra-conservative viewpoints shared by George Wallace on race and civil rights, yet used coded language to combat Wallace in the Upper South, where these states were less extreme on the segregation issue. Nixon sought to restore law and order to the nation's cities and provide new leadership in the Vietnam War.

During most of the campaign, Humphrey trailed Nixon significantly in polls taken from late August to early October. In the final month of the campaign, Humphrey narrowed Nixon's lead  after Wallace's candidacy collapsed and Johnson suspended bombing in the Vietnam War to appease the anti-war movement. In the end, Humphrey was unable to surpass Nixon on election day, losing the Electoral College by 111 votes (not counting faithless electors), as well as the popular vote by a narrow margin. This was the first presidential election after the passage of the Voting Rights Act of 1965, which had resulted in growing restoration of the franchise for racial minorities, especially in the South, where most had been disenfranchised since the turn of the century. Minorities in other areas also regained their ability to vote.

Richard Nixon also became the first non-incumbent vice president to be elected president, a feat that was not repeated until 2020, when Joe Biden was elected president. This also remains the most recent election in which the incumbent president was eligible to run again but was not the eventual nominee of that person's party. Nixon's victory also commenced the Republican Party's lock on certain Western states that would vote for them in every election until 1988, allowing them to win the presidency in five of the six presidential elections that took place in that period.

Background
In the election of 1964, incumbent Democratic U.S. president Lyndon B. Johnson won the largest popular vote landslide in U.S. presidential election history over Republican U.S. Senator Barry Goldwater. During the presidential term that followed, Johnson was able to achieve many political successes, including passage of his Great Society domestic programs (including "War on Poverty" legislation), landmark civil rights legislation, and the continued exploration of space. Despite these significant achievements, Johnson's popular support would be short-lived. Even as Johnson scored legislative victories, the country endured large-scale race riots in the streets of its larger cities, along with a generational revolt of young people and violent debates over foreign policy. The emergence of the hippie counter-culture, the rise of New Left activism, and the emergence of the Black Power movement exacerbated social and cultural clashes between classes, generations, and races. Adding to the national crisis, on April 4, 1968, civil rights leader Rev. Martin Luther King Jr., was assassinated in Memphis, Tennessee, igniting riots of grief and anger across the country. In Washington, D.C., rioting took place within a few blocks of the White House, and the government stationed soldiers with machine guns on the Capitol steps to protect it.

The Vietnam War was the primary reason for the precipitous decline of President Johnson's popularity. He had greatly escalated U.S. commitment that by late 1967, over 500,000 American soldiers were fighting in Vietnam. Draftees made up 42 percent of the military in Vietnam, but suffered 58% of the casualties, as nearly 1000 Americans a month were killed, and many more were injured. But resistance to the war rose as success seemed ever out of reach. The national news media began to focus on the high costs and ambiguous results of escalation, despite Johnson's repeated efforts to downplay the seriousness of the situation.

In early January 1968, Secretary of Defense Robert McNamara said the war would be winding down, claiming that the North Vietnamese were losing their will to fight. But, shortly thereafter, the North Vietnamese launched the Tet Offensive, in which they and Communist forces of Vietcong undertook simultaneous attacks on all government strongholds across South Vietnam. Though the uprising ended in a U.S. military victory, the scale of the Tet offensive led many Americans to question whether the war could be "won", or was worth the costs to the U.S. In addition, voters began to mistrust the government's assessment and reporting of the war effort. The Pentagon called for sending several hundred thousand more soldiers to Vietnam. Johnson's approval ratings fell below 35%. The Secret Service refused to let the president visit American colleges and universities, and prevented him from appearing at the 1968 Democratic National Convention in Chicago, because it could not guarantee his safety.

Republican Party nomination

 Other major candidates 

The following candidates were frequently interviewed by major broadcast networks, were listed in publicly published national polls, or ran a campaign that extended beyond their flying home delegation in the case of favorite sons.

Nixon received 1,679,443 votes''' in the primaries.

Primaries

The front-runner for the Republican nomination was former Vice President Richard Nixon, who formally began campaigning in January 1968. Nixon had worked tirelessly behind the scenes and was instrumental in Republican gains in Congress and governorships in the 1966 midterm elections. Thus, the party machinery and many of the new congressmen and governors supported him. Still, there was wariness in the Republican ranks over Nixon, who had lost the 1960 election to John F. Kennedy and then lost the 1962 California gubernatorial election. Some hoped a more "electable" candidate would emerge. The story of the 1968 Republican primary campaign and nomination may be seen as one Nixon opponent after another entering the race and then dropping out. Nixon was the front runner throughout the contest because of his superior organization, and he easily defeated the rest of the field.

Nixon's first challenger was Michigan Governor George W. Romney. A Gallup poll in mid-1967 showed Nixon with 39%, followed by Romney with 25%. After a fact-finding trip to Vietnam, Romney told Detroit talk show host Lou Gordon that he had been "brainwashed" by the military and the diplomatic corps into supporting the Vietnam War; the remark led to weeks of ridicule in the national news media. Turning against American involvement in Vietnam, Romney planned to run as the anti-war Republican version of Eugene McCarthy. But, following his "brainwashing" comment, Romney's support faded steadily; with polls showing him far behind Nixon, he withdrew from the race on February 28, 1968.

Senator Charles Percy was considered another potential threat to Nixon, and had planned on waging an active campaign after securing a role as Illinois's favorite son. Later, however, Percy declined to have his name listed on the ballot for the Illinois presidential primary. He no longer sought the presidential nomination.

Nixon won a resounding victory in the important New Hampshire primary on March 12, with 78% of the vote. Anti-war Republicans wrote in the name of New York governor Nelson Rockefeller, the leader of the Republican Party's liberal wing, who received 11% of the vote and became Nixon's new challenger. Rockefeller had not originally intended to run, having discounted a campaign for the nomination in 1965, and planned to make United States Senator Jacob Javits, the favorite son, either in preparation of a presidential campaign or to secure him the second spot on the ticket. As Rockefeller warmed to the idea of entering the race, Javits shifted his effort to seeking a third term in the Senate. Nixon led Rockefeller in the polls throughout the primary campaign, and though Rockefeller defeated Nixon and Governor John Volpe from Massachusetts primary on April 30, he otherwise fared poorly in state primaries and conventions. He had declared too late to get his name placed on state primary ballots.

By early spring, California governor Ronald Reagan, the leader of the Republican Party's conservative wing, had become Nixon's chief rival. In the Nebraska primary on May 14, Nixon won with 70% of the vote to 21% for Reagan and 5% for Rockefeller. While this was a wide margin for Nixon, Reagan remained Nixon's leading challenger. Nixon won the next primary of importance, Oregon, on May 15 with 65% of the vote, and won all the following primaries except for California (June 4), where only Reagan appeared on the ballot. Reagan's victory in California gave him a plurality of the nationwide primary vote, but his poor showing in most other state primaries left him far behind Nixon in the delegate count.

Total popular vote:

 Ronald Reagan: 1,696,632 (37.93%)
 Richard Nixon: 1,679,443 (37.54%)
 James A. Rhodes: 614,492 (13.74%)
 Nelson Rockefeller: 164,340 (3.67%)
 Unpledged: 140,639 (3.14%)
 Eugene McCarthy (write-in): 44,520 (1.00%)
 Harold Stassen: 31,655 (0.71%)
 John Volpe: 31,465 (0.70%)
 Others: 21,456 (0.51%)
 George Wallace (write-in): 15,291 (0.34%)

 Robert F. Kennedy (write-in): 14,524 (0.33%)
 Hubert Humphrey (write-in): 5,698 (0.13)
 Lyndon B. Johnson (write-in): 4,824 (0.11%)
 George W. Romney: 4,447 (0.10%)
 Raymond P. Shafer: 1,223 (0.03%)
 William Scranton: 724 (0.02%)
 Charles H. Percy: 689 (0.02%)
 Barry Goldwater: 598 (0.01%)
 John Lindsay: 591 (0.01%)

Republican Convention

As the 1968 Republican National Convention opened on August 5 in Miami Beach, Florida, the Associated Press estimated that Nixon had 656 delegate votes – 11 short of the number he needed to win the nomination. Reagan and Rockefeller were his only remaining opponents and they planned to unite their forces in a "stop-Nixon" movement.

Because Goldwater had done well in the Deep South, delegates to the 1968 Republican National Convention included more Southern conservatives than in past conventions. There seemed potential for the conservative Reagan to be nominated if no victor emerged on the first ballot. Nixon narrowly secured the nomination on the first ballot, with the aid of South Carolina Senator Strom Thurmond, who had switched parties in 1964. He selected dark horse Maryland Governor Spiro Agnew as his running mate, a choice which Nixon believed would unite the party, appealing to both Northern moderates and Southerners disaffected with the Democrats. Nixon's first choice for running mate was reportedly his longtime friend and ally Robert Finch, who was the Lieutenant Governor of California at the time. Finch declined that offer, but later accepted an appointment as the Secretary of Health, Education, and Welfare in Nixon's administration. With Vietnam a key issue, Nixon had strongly considered tapping his 1960 running mate, Henry Cabot Lodge Jr., a former U.S. senator, ambassador to the UN, and ambassador twice to South Vietnam.

As of the 2020 presidential election, 1968 was the last time that two siblings (Nelson and Winthrop Rockefeller) ran against each other in a presidential primary.

Democratic Party nomination

 Other major candidates 

The following candidates were frequently interviewed by major broadcast networks, were listed in publicly published national polls, or ran a campaign that extended beyond their home delegation in the case of favorite sons.

Humphrey received 166,463 votes in the primaries.

Enter Eugene McCarthy

Because Lyndon B. Johnson had been elected to the presidency only once, in 1964, and had served less than two full years of the term before that, the 22nd Amendment did not disqualify him from running for another term. As a result, it was widely assumed when 1968 began that President Johnson would run for another term, and that he would have little trouble winning the Democratic nomination.

Despite growing opposition to Johnson's policies in Vietnam, it appeared that no prominent Democratic candidate would run against a sitting president of his own party. It was also accepted at the beginning of the year that Johnson's record of domestic accomplishments would overshadow public opposition to the Vietnam War and that he would easily boost his public image after he started campaigning. Even Senator Robert F. Kennedy from New York, an outspoken critic of Johnson's policies, with a large base of support, publicly declined to run against Johnson in the primaries. Poll numbers also suggested that a large share of Americans who opposed the Vietnam War felt the growth of the anti-war hippie movement among younger Americans and violent unrest on college campuses
was not helping their cause. On January 30, however, claims by the Johnson administration that a recent troop surge would soon bring an end to the war were severely discredited when the Tet Offensive broke out. Although the American military was eventually able to fend off the attacks, and also inflict heavy losses among the communist opposition, the ability of the North Vietnamese Army and Viet Cong to launch large scale attacks during the Tet Offensive's long duration greatly weakened American support for the military draft and further combat operations in Vietnam. A recorded phone conversation which Johnson had with Chicago mayor Richard J. Daley on January 27 revealed that both men had become aware of Kennedy's private intention to enter the Democratic presidential primaries and that Johnson was willing to accept Daley's offer to run as Humphrey's vice president if he were to end his re-election campaign. Daley, whose city would host the 1968 Democratic National Convention, also preferred either Johnson or Humphrey over any other candidate, and stated that Kennedy had met him the week before, and that he was unsuccessful in his attempt to win over Daley's support.

In time, only Senator Eugene McCarthy from Minnesota proved willing to challenge Johnson openly. Running as an anti-war candidate in the New Hampshire primary, McCarthy hoped to pressure the Democrats into publicly opposing the Vietnam War. Since New Hampshire was the first presidential primary of 1968, McCarthy poured most of his limited resources into the state. He was boosted by thousands of young college students, led by youth coordinator Sam Brown, who shaved their beards and cut their hair to be "Clean for Gene". These students organized get-out-the-vote drives, rang doorbells, distributed McCarthy buttons and leaflets, and worked hard in New Hampshire for McCarthy. On March 12, McCarthy won 42 percent of the primary vote, to Johnson's 49 percent, a shockingly strong showing against an incumbent president, which was even more impressive because Johnson had more than 24 supporters running for the Democratic National Convention delegate slots to be filled in the election, while McCarthy's campaign organized more strategically. McCarthy won 20 of the 24 delegates. This gave McCarthy's campaign legitimacy and momentum.

Sensing Johnson's vulnerability, Senator Robert F. Kennedy announced his candidacy four days after the New Hampshire primary. Thereafter, McCarthy and Kennedy engaged in a series of state primaries. Despite Kennedy's high profile, McCarthy won most of the early primaries, including Kennedy's native state of Massachusetts and some primaries in which he and Kennedy were in direct competition. Following his victory in the key battleground state of Oregon, it was assumed that McCarthy was the preferred choice among the young voters.

Johnson withdraws

On March 31, 1968, following the New Hampshire primary and Kennedy's entry into the election, the president made a televised speech to the nation and said that he was suspending all bombing of North Vietnam in favor of peace talks. After concluding his speech, Johnson announced,
"With America's sons in the fields far away, with America's future under challenge right here at home, with our hopes and the world's hopes for peace in the balance every day, I do not believe that I should devote an hour or a day of my time to any personal partisan causes or to any duties, other than the awesome duties of this office — the presidency of your country. Accordingly, I shall not seek, and I will not accept, the nomination of my party for another term as your President."

Not discussed publicly at the time was Johnson's concern that he might not survive another term — Johnson's health was poor, and he had already suffered a serious heart attack in 1955. He died on January 22, 1973, two days after the end of the new presidential term. Bleak political forecasts also contributed to Johnson's withdrawal; internal polling by Johnson's campaign in Wisconsin, the next state to hold a primary election, showed the President trailing badly.

Historians have debated why Johnson quit a few days after his weak showing in New Hampshire. Jeff Shesol says Johnson wanted out of the White House, but also wanted vindication; when the indicators turned negative, he decided to leave. Lewis L. Gould says that Johnson had neglected the Democratic party, was hurting it by his Vietnam policies, and under-estimated McCarthy's strength until the last minute, when it was too late for Johnson to recover. Randall Bennett Woods said Johnson realized he needed to leave, in order for the nation to heal. Robert Dallek writes that Johnson had no further domestic goals, and realized that his personality had eroded his popularity. His health was poor, and he was pre-occupied with the Kennedy campaign; his wife was pressing for his retirement, and his base of support continued to shrink. Leaving the race would allow him to pose as a peace-maker. Anthony J. Bennett, however, said Johnson "had been forced out of a re-election race in 1968 by outrage over his policy in Southeast Asia".

In 2009, an AP reporter said that Johnson decided to end his re-election bid after CBS News anchor Walter Cronkite, who was influential, turned against the president's policy in Vietnam. During a CBS News editorial which aired on February 27, Cronkite recommended the US pursue peace negotiations. After watching Cronkite's editorial, Johnson allegedly exclaimed: "If I've lost Cronkite, I've lost Middle America." This quote by Johnson has been disputed for accuracy. Johnson was attending Texas Governor John Connally's birthday gala in Austin, Texas, when Cronkite's editorial aired and did not see the original broadcast. But, Cronkite and CBS News correspondent Bob Schieffer defended reports that the remark had been made. They said that members of Johnson's inner circle, who had watched the editorial with the president, including presidential aide George Christian and journalist Bill Moyers, later confirmed the accuracy of the quote to them. Schieffer, who was a reporter for the Star-Telegrams WBAP television station in Fort Worth, Texas, when Cronkite's editorial aired, acknowledged reports that the president saw the editorial's original broadcast were inaccurate, but claimed the president was able to watch a taping of it the morning after it aired and then made the remark. However, Johnson's January 27, 1968, phone conversion with Chicago Mayor Richard J. Daley revealed that the two were trying to feed Robert Kennedy's ego so he would stay in the race, convincing him that the Democratic Party was undergoing a "revolution". They suggested he might earn a spot as vice president.

After Johnson's withdrawal, the Democratic Party quickly split into four factions.
 The first faction consisted of labor unions and big-city party bosses (led by Mayor Richard J. Daley). This group had traditionally controlled the Democratic Party since the days of President Franklin D. Roosevelt, and they feared loss of their control over the party. After Johnson's withdrawal this group rallied to support Hubert Humphrey, Johnson's vice-president; it was also believed that President Johnson himself was covertly supporting Humphrey, despite his public claims of neutrality.
 The second faction, which rallied behind Senator Eugene McCarthy, was composed of college students, intellectuals, and upper-middle-class urban whites who had been the early activists against the war in Vietnam; they perceived themselves as the future of the Democratic Party.
 The third group was primarily composed of African-Americans, Latinos, and other minorities, as well as several anti-war groups; these groups rallied behind Senator Robert F. Kennedy.
 The fourth group consisted of white Southern Democrats. Some older voters, remembering the New Deal's positive impact upon the rural South, supported Vice-president Humphrey. Many would rally behind the third-party campaign of former Alabama Governor George Wallace as a "law and order" candidate.

Since the Vietnam War had become the major issue that was dividing the Democratic Party, and Johnson had come to symbolize the war for many liberal Democrats, Johnson believed that he could not win the nomination without a major struggle, and that he would probably lose the election in November to the Republicans. However, by withdrawing from the race, he could avoid the stigma of defeat, and he could keep control of the party machinery by giving the nomination to Humphrey, who had been a loyal vice-president. Milne (2011) argues that, in terms of foreign-policy in the Vietnam War, Johnson at the end wanted Nixon to be president rather than Humphrey, since Johnson agreed with Nixon, rather than Humphrey, on the need to defend South Vietnam from communism. However, Johnson's telephone calls show that Johnson believed the Nixon camp was deliberately sabotaging the Paris peace talks. He told Humphrey, who refused to use allegations based on illegal wiretaps of a presidential candidate. Nixon himself called Johnson and denied the allegations. Dallek concludes that Nixon's advice to Saigon made no difference, and that Humphrey was so closely identified with Johnson's unpopular policies that no last-minute deal with Hanoi could have affected the election.

Contest

After Johnson's withdrawal, Vice President Hubert Humphrey announced his candidacy. Kennedy was successful in four state primaries (Indiana, Nebraska, South Dakota, and California), and McCarthy won six (Wisconsin, Pennsylvania, Massachusetts, Oregon, New Jersey, and Illinois). However, in primaries where they campaigned directly against one another, Kennedy won three primaries (Indiana, Nebraska, and California), and McCarthy won only one (Oregon). Humphrey did not compete in the primaries, leaving that job to favorite sons who were his surrogates, notably United States Senator George A. Smathers from Florida, United States Senator Stephen M. Young from Ohio, and Governor Roger D. Branigin of Indiana. Instead, Humphrey concentrated on winning the delegates in non-primary states, where party leaders such as Chicago Mayor Richard J. Daley controlled the delegate votes in their states. Kennedy defeated Branigin and McCarthy in the Indiana primary, and then defeated McCarthy in the Nebraska primary. However, McCarthy upset Kennedy in the Oregon primary.

After Kennedy's defeat in Oregon, the California primary was seen as crucial to both Kennedy and McCarthy. McCarthy stumped the state's many colleges and universities, where he was treated as a hero for being the first presidential candidate to oppose the war. Kennedy campaigned in the ghettos and barrios of the state's larger cities, where he was mobbed by enthusiastic supporters. Kennedy and McCarthy engaged in a television debate a few days before the primary; it was generally considered a draw. On June 4, Kennedy narrowly defeated McCarthy in California, 46%–42%. However, McCarthy refused to withdraw from the race, and made it clear that he would contest Kennedy in the upcoming New York primary, where McCarthy had much support from anti-war activists in New York City. The New York primary quickly became a moot point, however, for Kennedy was assassinated shortly after midnight on June 5; he died twenty-six hours later at Good Samaritan Hospital. Kennedy had just given his victory speech in a crowded ballroom of the Ambassador Hotel in Los Angeles; he and his aides then entered a narrow kitchen pantry on their way to a banquet room to meet with reporters. In the pantry, Kennedy and five others were shot by Sirhan Sirhan, a 24-year-old Palestinian Christian with Jordanian citizenship, who hated Kennedy because of his support for Israel. Sirhan admitted his guilt, was convicted of murder, and is still in prison. In recent years some have cast doubt on Sirhan's guilt, including Sirhan himself, who said he was "brainwashed" into killing Kennedy and was a patsy.

Political historians still debate whether Kennedy could have won the Democratic nomination, had he lived. Some historians, such as Theodore H. White and Arthur M. Schlesinger, Jr., have argued that Kennedy's broad appeal and famed charisma would have convinced the party bosses at the Democratic Convention to give him the nomination. Jack Newfield, author of RFK: A Memoir, stated in a 1998 interview that on the night he was assassinated, "[Kennedy] had a phone conversation with Mayor Daley of Chicago, and Mayor Daley all but promised to throw the Illinois delegates to Bobby at the convention in August 1968. I think he said to me, and Pete Hamill: 'Daley is the ball game, and I think we have Daley. However, other writers such as Tom Wicker, who covered the Kennedy campaign for The New York Times, believe that Humphrey's large lead in delegate votes from non-primary states, combined with Senator McCarthy's refusal to quit the race, would have prevented Kennedy from ever winning a majority at the Democratic Convention, and that Humphrey would have been the Democratic nominee, even if Kennedy had lived. The journalist Richard Reeves and historian Michael Beschloss have both written that Humphrey was the likely nominee, and future Democratic National Committee chairman Larry O'Brien wrote in his memoirs that Kennedy's chances of winning the nomination had been slim, even after his win in California.

At the moment of RFK's death, the delegate totals were:
Hubert Humphrey 561
Robert F. Kennedy 393
Eugene McCarthy 258

Total popular vote:

 Eugene McCarthy: 2,914,933 (38.7%)
 Robert F. Kennedy: 2,304,542 (30.6%)
 Stephen M. Young: 549,140 (7.3%)
 Lyndon B. Johnson: 383,048 (5.1%)
 Roger D. Branigin: 238,700 (3.2%)
 George Smathers: 236,242 (3.1%)
 Hubert Humphrey: 166,463 (2.2%)

 Unpledged: 670,328 (8.9%)
 George Wallace: 33,520 (0.4%)
 Richard Nixon (write-in): 13,035 (0.2%)
 Nelson A. Rockefeller: 5,116 (0.1%)
 Ronald Reagan (write-in): 4,987 (0.1%)
 Ted Kennedy: 4,052 (0.1%)
 Others: 10,963 (0.1%)

Democratic Convention and antiwar protests

Robert Kennedy's death altered the dynamics of the race. Although Humphrey appeared the presumptive favorite for the nomination, thanks to his support from the traditional power blocs of the party, he was an unpopular choice with many of the anti-war elements within the party, who identified him with Johnson's controversial position on the Vietnam War. However, Kennedy's delegates failed to unite behind a single candidate who could have prevented Humphrey from getting the nomination. Some of Kennedy's support went to McCarthy, but many of Kennedy's delegates, remembering their bitter primary battles with McCarthy, refused to vote for him. Instead, these delegates rallied around the late-starting candidacy of Senator George McGovern of South Dakota, a Kennedy supporter in the spring primaries who had presidential ambitions himself. This division of the anti-war votes at the Democratic Convention made it easier for Humphrey to gather the delegates he needed to win the nomination.

When the 1968 Democratic National Convention opened in Chicago, thousands of young activists from around the nation gathered in the city to protest the Vietnam War. On the evening of August 28, in a clash which was covered on live television, Americans were shocked to see Chicago police brutally beating anti-war protesters in the streets of Chicago in front of the Conrad Hilton Hotel. While the protesters chanted, "The whole world is watching", the police used clubs and tear gas to beat back or arrest the protesters, leaving many of them bloody and dazed. The tear gas wafted into numerous hotel suites; in one of them Vice President Humphrey was watching the proceedings on television. The police said that their actions were justified because numerous police officers were being injured by bottles, rocks, and broken glass that were being thrown at them by the protestors. The protestors had also yelled insults at the police, calling them "pigs" and other epithets. The anti-war and police riot divided the Democratic Party's base: some supported the protestors and felt that the police were being heavy-handed, but others disapproved of the violence and supported the police. Meanwhile, the convention itself was marred by the strong-arm tactics of Chicago's mayor Richard J. Daley (who was seen on television angrily cursing Senator Abraham Ribicoff from Connecticut, who made a speech at the convention denouncing the excesses of the Chicago police). In the end, the nomination itself was anticlimactic, with Vice-president Humphrey handily beating McCarthy and McGovern on the first ballot.

After the delegates nominated Humphrey, the convention then turned to selecting a vice-presidential nominee. The main candidates for this position were Senators Edward M. Kennedy from Massachusetts, Edmund Muskie from Maine, and Fred R. Harris from Oklahoma; Governors Richard Hughes of New Jersey and Terry Sanford of North Carolina; Mayor Joseph Alioto of San Francisco, California; former Deputy Secretary of Defense Cyrus Vance; and Ambassador Sargent Shriver from Maryland. Another idea floated was to tap Republican Governor Nelson Rockefeller of New York, one of the most liberal Republicans. Ted Kennedy was Humphrey's first choice, but the senator turned him down. After narrowing it down to Senator Muskie and Senator Harris, Vice-president Humphrey chose Muskie, a moderate and environmentalist from Maine, for the nomination. The convention complied with the request and nominated Senator Muskie as Humphrey's running mate.

The publicity from the anti-war riots crippled Humphrey's campaign from the start, and it never fully recovered. Before 1968 the city of Chicago had been a frequent host for the political conventions of both parties; since 1968 only one national convention has been held there (the Democratic convention of 1996, which nominated Bill Clinton for a second term).

Source: Keating Holland, "All the Votes... Really", CNN

EndorsementsHubert Humphrey President Lyndon B. Johnson
 Mayor Richard J. Daley of Chicago
 Former President Harry S. Truman
 Singer/actor Frank SinatraRobert F. Kennedy Senator Abraham Ribicoff from Connecticut
 Senator George McGovern from South Dakota
 Senator Vance Hartke from Indiana
 Labor Leader Cesar Chavez
 Writer Truman Capote
 Writer Norman Mailer
 Actress Shirley MacLaine
 Actress Stefanie Powers
 Actor Robert Vaughn
 Actor Peter Lawford
 Singer Bobby DarinEugene McCarthy Representative Don Edwards from California
 Actor Paul Newman
 Actress Tallulah Bankhead
 Playwright Arthur Miller
 Writer William StyronGeorge McGovern (during convention)
 Senator Abraham Ribicoff from Connecticut
 Governor Harold E. Hughes of Iowa

American Independent Party nomination

The American Independent Party, which was established in 1967 by Bill and Eileen Shearer, nominated former Alabama Governor George Wallace – whose pro-racial segregation policies had been rejected by the mainstream of the Democratic Party – as the party's candidate for president. The impact of the Wallace campaign was substantial, winning the electoral votes of several states in the Deep South. He appeared on the ballot in all fifty states, but not the District of Columbia. Although he did not come close to winning any states outside the South, Wallace was the 1968 presidential candidate who most disproportionately drew his support from among young men. Wallace also proved to be popular among blue-collar workers in the North and Midwest, and he took many votes which might have gone to Humphrey.

Wallace was not expected to win the election – his strategy was to prevent either major party candidate from winning a preliminary majority in the Electoral College. Although Wallace put considerable effort into mounting a serious general election campaign, his presidential bid was also a continuation of Southern efforts to elect unpledged electors that had taken place in every election from 1956 – he had his electors promise to vote not necessarily for him but rather for whomever he directed them to support – his objective was not to move the election into the U.S. House of Representatives where he would have had little influence, but rather to give himself the bargaining power to determine the winner. Wallace's running mate was retired four star General Curtis LeMay.

Prior to deciding on LeMay, Wallace gave serious consideration to former U.S. senator, governor, and Baseball Commissioner A. B. Happy Chandler of Kentucky as his running mate. Chandler and Wallace met a number of times; however, Chandler said that he and Wallace were unable to come to an agreement regarding their positions on racial matters. Paradoxically, Chandler supported the segregationist Dixiecrats in the 1948 presidential elections. However, after being re-elected Governor of Kentucky in 1955, he used National Guard troops to enforce school integration.

LeMay embarrassed Wallace's campaign in the fall by suggesting that nuclear weapons could be used in Vietnam.

Other parties and candidates

Also on the ballot in two or more states were black activist Eldridge Cleaver (who was ineligible to take office, as he would have only been 33 years of age on January 20, 1969) for the Peace and Freedom Party; Henning Blomen for the Socialist Labor Party; Fred Halstead for the Socialist Workers Party; E. Harold Munn for the Prohibition Party; and Charlene Mitchell – the first African-American woman to run for president, and the first woman to receive valid votes in a general election – for the Communist Party. Comedians Dick Gregory and Pat Paulsen were notable write-in candidates. A facetious presidential candidate for 1968 was a pig named Pigasus, as a political statement by the Yippies, to illustrate their premise that "one pig's as good as any other".

General election

 Polling 

Campaign strategies
Nixon developed a "Southern strategy" that was designed to appeal to conservative white southerners, who had traditionally voted Democratic, but were opposed to Johnson and Humphrey's support for the civil rights movement, as well as the rioting that had broken out in the ghettos of most large cities. Wallace, however, won over many of the voters Nixon targeted, effectively splitting that voting bloc. Indeed, Wallace deliberately targeted many states he had little chance of carrying himself in the hope that by splitting as many votes with Nixon as possible he would give competitive states to Humphrey and, by extension, boost his own chances of denying both opponents an Electoral College majority.

Since he was well behind Nixon in the polls as the campaign began, Humphrey opted for a slashing, fighting campaign style. He repeatedly – and unsuccessfully – challenged Nixon to a televised debate, and he often compared his campaign to the successful underdog effort of President Harry Truman, another Democrat who had trailed in the polls, in the 1948 presidential election. Humphrey predicted that he, like Truman, would surprise the experts and win an upset victory.

Campaign themes
Nixon campaigned on a theme to restore "law and order", which appealed to many voters angry with the hundreds of violent riots that had taken place across the country in the previous few years. Following the murder of Martin Luther King in April 1968, there was massive rioting in inner city areas. The police were overwhelmed and President Johnson decided to call out the U.S. Army. Nixon also opposed forced busing to desegregate schools. Proclaiming himself a supporter of civil rights, he recommended education as the solution rather than militancy. During the campaign, Nixon proposed government tax incentives to African Americans for small businesses and home improvements in their existing neighborhoods.

During the campaign, Nixon also used as a theme his opposition to the decisions of Chief Justice Earl Warren, pledging to "remake the Supreme Court." Many conservatives were critical of Chief Justice Warren for using the Supreme Court to promote liberal policies in the fields of civil rights, civil liberties, and the separation of church and state. Nixon promised that if he were elected president, he would appoint justices who would take a less-active role in creating social policy. In another campaign promise, he pledged to end the draft. During the 1960s, Nixon had been impressed by a paper he had read by Professor Martin Anderson of Columbia University. Anderson had argued in the paper for an end to the draft and the creation of an all-volunteer army. Nixon also saw ending the draft as an effective way to undermine the anti-Vietnam war movement, since he believed affluent college-age youths would stop protesting the war once their own possibility of having to fight in it was gone.

Humphrey, meanwhile, promised to continue and expand the Great Society welfare programs started by President Johnson, and to continue the Johnson Administration's "War on Poverty". He also promised to continue the efforts of Presidents Kennedy and Johnson, and the Supreme Court, in promoting the expansion of civil rights and civil liberties for minority groups. However, Humphrey also felt constrained for most of his campaign in voicing any opposition to the Vietnam War policies of President Johnson, due to his fear that Johnson would reject any peace proposals he made and undermine his campaign. As a result, early in his campaign Humphrey often found himself the target of anti-war protestors, some of whom heckled and disrupted his campaign rallies.

Humphrey's comeback and the October surprise
After the Democratic Convention in late August, Humphrey trailed Nixon by double digits in most polls, and his chances seemed hopeless. Many within Humphrey's campaign saw their real goal as avoiding the potential humiliation of finishing behind Wallace in the electoral college vote (if not necessarily the popular vote), rather than having any serious chance of defeating Nixon. According to Time magazine, "The old Democratic coalition was disintegrating, with untold numbers of blue-collar workers responding to Wallace's blandishments, Negroes threatening to sit out the election, liberals disaffected over the Vietnam War, the South lost. The war chest was almost empty, and the party's machinery, neglected by Lyndon Johnson, creaked in disrepair." Calling for "the politics of joy", and using the still-powerful labor unions as his base, Humphrey fought back. In order to distance himself from Johnson, and to take advantage of the Democratic plurality in voter registration, Humphrey stopped being identified in ads as "Vice-President Hubert Humphrey", instead being labelled "Democratic candidate Hubert Humphrey".

Humphrey attacked Wallace as a racist bigot who appealed to the darker impulses of Americans. Wallace had been rising in the polls as a result of tailoring his message to audiences outside of his southern strongholds by using anti-establishment rhetoric and attacks on "concentrated wealth", with Wallace's polling numbers peaking at 21% nationally in late September and early October. However, Wallace's momentum went into reverse after he selected Curtis LeMay as his running mate. Curtis LeMay's suggestion of using tactical nuclear weapons in Vietnam conjured up the worst memories of the 1964 Goldwater campaign. Labor unions also undertook a major effort to win back union members who were supporting Wallace, with some substantial success. Polling numbers that had showed Wallace winning almost one-half of union members in the summer of 1968 went increasingly into sharp decline as the election campaign progressed into the fall up to early November election day. As election day approached and Wallace's support in the North, Midwest and West began to wane, Humphrey finally began to climb in the polls.

In October, Humphrey—who was rising sharply in the polls due to the sharp decline of the Wallace polling—began to distance himself publicly from the Johnson administration on the Vietnam War, calling for a bombing halt. The key turning point for Humphrey's campaign came when President Johnson officially announced a bombing halt, and even a possible peace deal, the weekend before the election. The "Halloween Peace" gave Humphrey's campaign a badly needed boost. In addition, Senator Eugene McCarthy finally endorsed a vote for Humphrey in late October after previously refusing to do so, and by election day the polls were reporting a dead heat.

Nixon campaign sabotage of peace talks
The Nixon campaign had anticipated a possible "October surprise", a peace agreement produced by the Paris negotiations; as such an agreement would be a boost to Humphrey, Nixon thwarted any last-minute chances of a "Halloween Peace". Nixon told campaign aide and his future White House Chief of Staff H. R. Haldeman to put a "monkey wrench" into an early end to the war. Johnson was enraged and said that Nixon had "blood on his hands", and that Senate Minority Leader Everett Dirksen agreed with Johnson that such action was "treason".Robert "KC" Johnson. "Did Nixon Commit Treason in 1968? What The New LBJ Tapes Reveal". History News Network, January 26, 2009. Defense Secretary Clark Clifford considered the moves an illegal violation of the Logan Act. A former director of the Nixon Library called it a "covert action" which "laid the skulduggery of his presidency".

Bryce Harlow, former Eisenhower White House staff member, claimed to have "a double agent working in the White House... I kept Nixon informed." Harlow and Nixon's future National Security Advisor and Secretary of State Henry Kissinger, who was friendly with both campaigns and guaranteed a job in either a Humphrey or Nixon administration, separately predicted Johnson's "bombing halt": "The word is out that we are making an effort to throw the election to Humphrey. Nixon has been told of it", Democratic senator George Smathers informed Johnson.

Nixon asked Anna Chennault to be his "channel to Mr. Thieu" in order to advise him to refuse participation in the talks, in what is sometimes described as the "Anna Chennault Affair". Thieu was promised a better deal under a Nixon administration. Chennault agreed and periodically reported to John Mitchell that Thieu had no intention of attending a peace conference. On November 2, Chennault informed the South Vietnamese ambassador: "I have just heard from my boss in Albuquerque who says his boss [Nixon] is going to win. And you tell your boss [Thieu] to hold on a while longer." In 1997, Chennault admitted that, "I was constantly in touch with Nixon and Mitchell". The effort also involved Texas Senator John Tower and Kissinger, who traveled to Paris on behalf of the Nixon campaign. William Bundy stated that Kissinger obtained "no useful inside information" from his trip to Paris, and "almost any experienced Hanoi watcher might have come to the same conclusion". While Kissinger may have "hinted that his advice was based on contacts with the Paris delegation", this sort of "self-promotion ... is at worst a minor and not uncommon practice, quite different from getting and reporting real secrets".

Johnson learned of the Nixon-Chennault effort because the NSA was intercepting communications in Vietnam. In response, Johnson ordered NSA surveillance of Chennault and wire-tapped the South Vietnamese embassy and members of the Nixon campaign. He did not leak the information to the public because he did not want to "shock America" with the revelation, nor reveal that the NSA was intercepting communications in Vietnam. Johnson did make information available to Humphrey, but at this point Humphrey thought he was going to win the election, so he did not reveal the information to the public. Humphrey later regretted this as a mistake. The South Vietnamese government withdrew from peace negotiations, and Nixon publicly offered to go to Saigon to help the negotiations. A promising "peace bump" ended up in "shambles" for the Democratic Party.

Election
The election on November 5, 1968, proved to be extremely close, and it was not until the following morning that the television news networks were able to declare Nixon the winner. The key states proved to be California, Ohio, and Illinois, all of which Nixon won by three percentage points or less. Had Humphrey carried all three of these states, he would have won the election. Had he carried only two of them or just California among them, George Wallace would have succeeded in his aim of preventing an electoral college majority for any candidate, and the decision would have been given to the House of Representatives, at the time controlled by the Democratic Party. Nixon won the popular vote with a plurality of 512,000 votes, or a victory margin of about one percentage point. In the electoral college Nixon's victory was larger, as he carried 32 states with 301 electoral votes, compared to Humphrey's 13 states and 191 electoral votes and Wallace's five states and 46 electoral votes.

Richard Nixon was able to win the Electoral College, dominating several regions in the Western United States, Midwest, Upland South, and portions of the Northeast, while winning the popular vote by a relatively small 511,944 votes over Democratic nominee Hubert Humphrey. Democratic nominee Hubert Humphrey performed relatively well in the Northeast and Upper Midwest. Wallace finished last with five states in the Deep South; he is the most recent third-party candidate to win any states. This is the first time that the Republican popular vote margin was under 5 points since 1896.

Out of all the states that Nixon had previously carried in 1960, Maine and Washington were the only two states that did not vote for Nixon again in 1968; while Nixon carried them four years later during his re-election campaign in 1972. He also carried eight states that voted for John F. Kennedy in 1960: Illinois, New Jersey, Missouri, North Carolina, South Carolina, New Mexico, Nevada and Delaware. This was the last time until 1988 that the state of Washington voted Democratic and until 1992 that Connecticut, Maine, and Michigan voted Democratic in the general election. Nixon was also the last Republican candidate to win a presidential election without carrying Alabama, Arkansas, Louisiana, Mississippi, and Texas. This is the first time which the Republican candidate captured the White House without carrying Michigan, Minnesota, Maine and Pennsylvania. He would be the last Republican candidate to carry Minnesota (four years later, in 1972), as of 2020. This is also the first time since 1916 that Minnesota voted for the candidate who did not eventually win.

Remarkably, Nixon won the election despite winning only two of the six states (Arizona and South Carolina) won by Republican Barry Goldwater four years earlier. He remains the only presidential candidate to win in spite of defending such a low number of his own party's states. All of the remaining four States carried by Goldwater were carried by Wallace in 1968. They would be won by Nixon in 1972. Four of the fives states won by Wallace had voted for Goldwater.

Of the 3,130 counties/districts/independent cities making returns, Nixon won in 1,859 (59.39%) while Humphrey carried 693 (22.14%). Wallace was victorious in 578 counties (18.47%), all of which (with one exception of Pemiscot County, Missouri) were located in the South.

Nixon said that Humphrey left a gracious message congratulating him, noting, "I know exactly how he felt. I know how it feels to lose a close one."

Results

Nixon's victory is often considered a realigning election in American politics. From 1932 to 1964, the Democratic Party was undoubtedly the majority party, winning seven out of nine presidential elections, and their agenda influenced policies undertaken by the Republican Eisenhower administration. The 1968 election reversed the situation completely. From 1968 until 2004, Republicans won seven out of ten presidential elections, and its policies clearly affected those enacted by the Democratic Clinton administration via the Third Way.

The election was a seismic event in the long-term realignment in Democratic Party support, especially in the South. Nationwide, the bitter splits over civil rights, the new left, the Vietnam War, and other "culture wars" were slow to heal. Democrats could no longer count on white Southern support for the presidency, as Republicans made major gains in suburban areas and areas filled with Northern migrants. The rural Democratic "courthouse cliques" in the South lost power. While Democrats controlled local and state politics in the South, Republicans usually won the presidential vote. In 1968, Humphrey won less than ten percent of the white Southern vote, with two-thirds of his vote in the region coming from blacks, who now voted in full strength. From 1968 until 2004, only two Democrats were elected president, both native Southerners – Jimmy Carter of Georgia and Bill Clinton of Arkansas. Not until 2008 did a Northern Democrat, Barack Obama of Illinois, again win a presidential election. In 2020, another Northern Democrat, Joe Biden of Delaware, won a presidential election.Michael A. Cohen, American Maelstrom: The 1968 Election and the Politics of Division (2016)

Another important result of this election was that it led to several reforms in how the Democratic Party chose its presidential nominees. In 1969, the McGovern–Fraser Commission adopted a set of rules for the states to follow in selecting convention delegates. These rules reduced the influence of party leaders on the nominating process and provided greater representation for minorities, women, and youth. The reforms led most states to adopt laws requiring primary elections, instead of party leaders, to choose delegates.

After 1968, the only way to win the party's presidential nomination became through the primary process; Humphrey turned out to be the last nominee of either major party to win his party's nomination without having directly competed in the primaries. Interestingly, this remains the most recent presidential election in which the incumbent president was not nominated for a presidential term despite being eligible, and the only such election to occur after the Twenty-second Amendment came into effect. It is also the last election in which any third-party candidate won an entire state's electoral votes, with Wallace carrying five states. This is one of two times in American history that two former or current Vice President were major party nominees, after 1800. , this is the last time that all 50 states and the District of Columbia would vote under a winner-take-all system. Maine would begin allocating its electoral votes by congressional district in 1972 and Nebraska would begin doing the same in 1992.

This election was the last time until 1992 that the Democratic nominee won Connecticut, Maine, and Michigan and the last until 1988 that Washington voted Democratic, and the last time a Republican won the presidency without winning Alabama, Arkansas, Louisiana, Mississippi, and Texas. It was also the first time since 1888 that bellwether Coös County, New Hampshire did not support the winning candidate.

This was the first time since 1928 that North Carolina voted for a Republican, and the first since 1912 (only the second and final time since 1852) that Maine and Vermont did not support the same party. Similarly, it is the last time that Oregon and Washington did not support the same party, meaning the two neighboring states have only voted for different candidates twice in 100 years. By losing New York, Nixon became the third victorious candidate to lose his home state, which also occurred in 1844, 1916, and 2016. This election and 1916 are the only times a winning presidential and vice-presidential each lost their home states.

Despite the narrow (0.7%) difference in the popular vote, Humphrey took only 35.5% of the electoral vote. This disparity prompted the introduction of the Bayh–Celler amendment in Congress, which would have replaced the Electoral College with a direct election of the presidency. The effort was not successful and the Electoral College is still in force.

ResultsSource (Popular Vote): Source (Electoral Vote): 

Geography of results

Cartographic gallery

Results by state

Close states
States where margin of victory was less than 5 percentage points (223 electoral votes):

Missouri, 1.13% (20,488 votes)
Texas, 1.27% (38,960 votes)
Maryland, 1.64% (20,315 votes)
Washington, 2.11% (27,527 votes)
New Jersey, 2.13% (61,261 votes)
Ohio, 2.28% (90,428 votes) (tipping point state for Nixon win)
Alaska, 2.64% (2,189 votes)
Illinois, 2.92% (134,960 votes) (tipping point state for Humphrey win)
California, 3.08% (223,346 votes)
Delaware, 3.51% (7,520 votes)
Pennsylvania, 3.57% (169,388 votes)
Wisconsin, 3.62% (61,193 votes)
Tennessee, 3.83% (47,800 votes)

States where margin of victory was more than 5 percentage points, but less than 10 percentage points (155 electoral votes):

Kentucky, 5.14% (64,870 votes)
Connecticut, 5.16% (64,840 votes)
New York, 5.46% (370,538 votes)
South Carolina, 5.79% (38,632 votes)
Oregon, 6.05% (49,567 votes)
Michigan, 6.73% (222,417 votes)
Arkansas, 7.64% (46,565 votes)
Nevada, 8.17% (12,590 votes)
New Hampshire, 8.17% (24,314 votes)
North Carolina, 8.25% (131,004 votes)
West Virginia, 8.82% (66,536 votes)
Montana, 9.01% (24,718 votes)
Colorado, 9.14% (74,171 votes)
Vermont, 9.22% (14,887 votes)
Florida, 9.60% (210,010 votes)

Notes: In Alabama, Wallace was the official Democratic Party nominee, while Humphrey ran on the ticket of short-lived National Democratic Party of Alabama, loyal to him as an official Democratic Party nominee.

In North Carolina one Nixon Elector cast his ballot for George Wallace (President) and Curtis LeMay (Vice President).

 Statistics 

Counties with Highest Percent of Vote (Republican)
 Hooker County, Nebraska 87.94% Jackson County, Kentucky 84.09% McIntosh County, North Dakota 82.65% McPherson County, South Dakota 80.34% Sioux County, Iowa 80.04%Counties with Highest Percent of Vote (Democratic)
 Duval County, Texas 88.74% Jim Hogg County, Texas 82.06% Washington, D.C. 81.82% Webb County, Texas 79.65% Suffolk County, Massachusetts 75.62%Counties with Highest Percent of Vote (American Independent)
 Geneva County, Alabama 91.73% George County, Mississippi 91.20% Lamar County, Alabama 88.25% Calhoun County, Mississippi 87.80% Holmes County, Florida 87.21%National voter demographicsSource: Congressional Quarterly Weekly Report. "Group Analysis of the 1968 Presidential Vote" XXVI, No. 48 (November 1968), p. 3218.

Voter demographics in the SouthSource:' Congressional Quarterly Weekly Report. "Group Analysis of the 1968 Presidential Vote", XXVI, No. 48 (November 1968), p. 3218.

See also
 1968 United States House of Representatives elections
 1968 United States Senate elections
 1968 United States gubernatorial elections
 History of the United States (1964–1980)
 History of the United States Democratic Party
 History of the United States Republican Party
 List of presidents of the United States
 First inauguration of Richard Nixon

Sources

References

Notes

Further reading

 Boomhower, Ray E. "Fighting the Good Fight: John Bartlow Martin and Hubert Humphrey's 1968 Presidential Campaign." Indiana Magazine of History (2020) 116#1 pp 1–29. 
Brown, Stuart Gerry. The Presidency on Trial: Robert Kennedy's 1968 Campaign and Afterwards. U. Press of Hawaii, 1972. 155 pp.
Burner, David, and West, Thomas R. The Torch Is Passed: The Kennedy Brothers and American Liberalism. (1984). 307 pp.

 Coffey, Justin P. Spiro Agnew and the Rise of the Republican Right (ABC-CLIO, 2015).
 Cohen, Michael A. American Maelstrom: The 1968 Election and the Politics of Division (Oxford UP, 2016) excerpt and online review
 
 
 Herzog, Arthur. McCarthy for President (1969)
 
 Jamieson, Patrick E. "Seeing the Lyndon B. Johnson Presidency through the March 31, 1968 Withdrawal Speech." Presidential Studies Quarterly Vol 29#1 1999 pp. 134+
 Johnstone, Andrew, and Andrew Priest, eds.  US Presidential Elections and Foreign Policy: Candidates, Campaigns, and Global Politics from FDR to Bill Clinton (2017) pp 177–202. online
 Kimball, Warren F. "The Election of 1968." Diplomatic History 2004 28(4): 513–528.  Fulltext online in SwetsWise, Ingenta and Ebsco. Comments by others at pp. 563–576; reply, p. 577.
 
 LaFerber, Walter. The Deadly Bet: LBJ, Vietnam, and the 1968 Election (2005) short survey
 Lesher, Stephan. George Wallace: American Populist. (1994). 587 pp.
 Lichtenstein, Nelson, ed. Political Profiles: The Johnson Years. 1976. short biographies of 400+ key politicians.
 Longley, Kyle. LBJ's 1968: Power, Politics, and the Presidency in America's Year of Upheaval (2018) excerpt
 
 Nelson, Michael. Resilient America: Electing Nixon in 1968, Channeling Dissent, and Dividing Government (University Press of Kansas; 2014) 360 pages
 Nelson, Michael. "The Historical Presidency: Lost Confidence: The Democratic Party, the Vietnam War, and the 1968 Election." Presidential Studies Quarterly 48.3 (2018): 570–585.
 O'Mara, Margaret. Pivotal Tuesdays: Four Elections That Shaped the Twentieth Century (2015), compares 1912, 1932, 1968, 1992 in terms of social, economic, and political history
 
 
 
 
 Schumacher, Michael. The Contest: The 1968 Election and the War for America's Soul (U of Minnesota Press, 2018) 540 pp. online review
 Shesol, Jeff. Mutual Contempt: Lyndon Johnson, Robert Kennedy, and the Feud that Defined a Decade (1997)
 Small, Melvin. "The Election of 1968", Diplomatic History (2004) 28#4 pp 513–528, on foreign-policy issues online
 Solberg, Carl. Hubert Humphrey (2003), scholarly biography excerpt and text search
 Time. "Wallace's Army: The Coalition Of Frustration", Time October 18, 1968
 
 Woods, Randall. LBJ: Architect of American Ambition (2006)

Primary sources
 Gallup, George H., ed. The Gallup Poll: Public Opinion, 1935–1971. 3 vols. Random House, 1972. press releases;
 
 McCarthy, Eugene. The Year of the People (1969), memoir
 ; firsthand reporting
  online
 , famous report by American journalist
 Chester, Edward W. A guide to political platforms (1977) online
 Porter, Kirk H., and Donald Bruce Johnson, eds. National party platforms, 1840-1972'' (1973)

External links
 The Election Wall's 1968 Election Video Page
 1968 popular vote by counties
 1968 popular vote by states
 1968 popular vote by states (with bar graphs)
 Campaign commercials from the 1968 election
 "LBJ Tapes Implicate Nixon With Treason". ABC News. December 5, 2008, (video).
 Election of 1968 in Counting the Votes

 
Presidency of Richard Nixon
Richard Nixon
Hubert Humphrey
George Wallace
November 1968 events in the United States